Keith Valentine Graham (born 24 June 1958), better known as Levi Roots, is a British-Jamaican reggae musician, television personality, celebrity chef, author and businessman currently residing in Brixton, in South London. According to the Sunday Times Rich List, Roots is worth an estimated £30m.

Background
Roots was born in Clarendon, Jamaica. He was raised by his grandmother after his parents moved to the United Kingdom, until he joined them at age 11. He was raised as a Christian, but converted to the Rastafari faith aged 18.

Music
Roots has performed with James Brown and Maxi Priest and was nominated for a Best Reggae Act MOBO award in 1998. He was a friend of Bob Marley when he resided in the UK and performed "Happy Birthday Mr. President" for Nelson Mandela in 1996 on his trip to Brixton. He gained widespread fame after appearing on the UK television programme Dragons' Den in 2007, where he gained £50,000 funding for his Reggae Reggae Sauce.

Reggae Reggae Sauce
Levi Roots' Reggae Reggae Sauce is a jerk barbecue sauce. In 2006, 4,000 bottles of the sauce were sold at the Notting Hill Carnival.

He later took the sauce to a food trade show, where he was spotted by a BBC producer who approached him to appear on Dragons' Den. He appeared in the first episode of the fourth series in February 2007, seeking £50,000 of investment from the Dragons in return for a 20% equity stake in Reggae Reggae Sauce. Despite erroneously claiming that he had an order for 2.5 million litres of the sauce (when in fact the order was for 2,500 kilograms), he was offered the £50,000 for a 40% stake in his business by Peter Jones and Richard Farleigh. Shortly after his appearance on the programme, Sainsbury's announced that they would be stocking the sauce in 600 of their stores.

Roots falsely claimed that his sauce recipe had been passed down to him by his grandmother. He later admitted in court that this was not true. 

Leading from the success of his spicy sauce, Roots released an extended version of his song "Reggae Reggae Sauce" which features one of his children (Joanne) on backing vocals. The music video features a cameo from Peter Jones. All of the money raised went to Comic Relief. The song, which formed part of his pitch on Dragons' Den (and was also sung by Roots in an appearance on Harry Hill's TV Burp), was also released as a download single. "Proper Tings (The Reggae Reggae Sauce Song)" received its first play on Allan Lake's breakfast show on Core.

A news story in The Grocer magazine in 2010 states that a range of ready meals were to be launched, and that Roots had stated that the value of the brand had then increased to £30 million.

Restaurants
Levi Roots' first London restaurant, the Papine Jerk Centre, was on the Winstanley Estate in Battersea, Clapham Junction from 2010-2012. His children were working alongside him. The shop would also provide a lunchtime service to a local school (Thames Christian College) before closing. In December 2015, Levi Roots opened his first franchise restaurant in Westfield Stratford City. It closed in 2019.

Books and television
Levi Roots' Reggae Reggae Cookbook was published in 2008, with a foreword by Roots' investor, Peter Jones. The book has chapters on Roots' story of coming to London and an introduction to Caribbean ingredients. To coincide with the release of his recipe book, Roots appeared on the 3 June 2008 episode of BBC's Ready Steady Cook as a celebrity. He achieved second place against Lesley Waters.

Roots had a television cooking show, Caribbean Food Made Easy, on BBC2, with a book of the same name published in August 2009. The show followed Roots as he travelled the UK and Jamaica demonstrating easy ways to cook Caribbean food at home.

Roots appeared on Celebrity Mastermind in 2010, coming second with 13 points. He also appeared on Big Brother, where he cooked a Caribbean barbecue for the housemates. Roots also made a special appearance in the 2011 urban comedy movie Anuvahood where he plays himself.  On 22 February 2018 he appeared in the 8th episode of the 7th series of the BBC detective programme Death in Paradise. He played the part of Billy Springer.

Interviews
On 12 July 2017, an interview with Levi was published in The Guardian by Katherine Hassell; the interview was titled "Levi Roots: ‘My parents moved to Britain when I was four. I didn’t see them again until I was 11’".

On 8 November 2020, an interview with Levi was published in Business Digest Magazine by Fanele Moyo, titled "Levi Roots: ‘My success tips for the unemployed black youth’".

Personal life
When he appeared on BBC Radio 4's Desert Island Discs Roots revealed that his relationship with his father had been a difficult one, because his father was "a bit of a stranger." He said: "My brothers and sisters all went to school before they left Jamaica but, being the youngest, I never got any education while I was there. I think that I was a bit of a disappointment to him.” Roots has eight children with seven different mothers, including son Christopher. Roots has previously been imprisoned for drug offences.

Levi was appointed Chair of St Pauls Carnival in Bristol in 2021.

External links

References

Living people
People from Brixton
People from Clarendon Parish, Jamaica
Male actors from London
Musicians from London
Jamaican emigrants to the United Kingdom
20th-century Black British male singers
English Rastafarians
British male film actors
British reggae musicians
British chefs
British writers
English businesspeople
English people of Jamaican descent
British former Christians
Converts to the Rastafari movement
1958 births